Rhode Island School for the Deaf (RISD or RISDeaf) is a school for deaf students established in 1876 in the US state of Rhode Island.

History

Founding
The school was founded on the initiative of the parents of Jeanie Lippitt, who became deaf due to scarlet fever when she was four years old in 1856. Her mother, Mary Ann Lippitt, taught Jeanie to communicate through lip reading and speaking.

Jeanie's father, Henry Lippitt, became governor of Rhode Island in 1875. During these years, Jeanie visited the Rhode Island State house to convince members of the General Assembly to establish a school for deaf children. Henry's political endorsements allowed Jeanie's wishes to come true in 1877 when the General Assembly passed a bill to found a deaf school. The Rhode Island School for the Deaf is still functioning today in 2018.

Post-founding
Circa 1966 John F. Fogarty, a member of the Legislature of Rhode Island, got into a conflict with Governor of Rhode Island John Chafee after Fogarty accused the school of being poorly run. The State Board of Education hired three outside consultants and they wrote a report criticizing the management of the school, asking for it to be restructured. It specifically criticized how there were no refurbishments since 1935 and it also criticized the dormitories though the report was not sure whether the dormitories should be abolished.

School name history
1876–1879: Providence Day School for the Deaf
1880–1888: Rhode Island School for the Deaf
1889–1892: State School for the Deaf
1895–1930: Rhode Island Institute for the Deaf
1931–present: Rhode Island School for the Deaf

Principals/directors
1876–1882: Joseph Warren Homer
1882–1885: Katherine H. Austin
1885–1889: Anna M. Black
1889–1906: Laura DeLisle Richards
1906–1918: Edwin G. Hurd
1918–1932: Anna C. Hurd
1932–1966: John Yale Crouter
1966–2001: Peter M. Blackwell
2001–2003: Reginald Redding
2003–2007: John F. Plante (interim director)
2007–2011: Lori Dunsmore
2012–present: Nancy Maguire Heath

Source:

Campus 
The school does not operate dormitories.
In previous eras it did operate a dormitory.

Student body 
The school takes students from Rhode Island, Connecticut, and Massachusetts. School districts in Rhode Island and southeast Massachusetts refer students to RISD.

Academics 
RISD serves deaf and hard of hearing students in grades preschool through high school. RISD believes strongly in students becoming bilingual in ASL and English.

Subjects taught include ASL, math, English, science, and social studies. Work experience programs are provided for high school students.

Athletics and after-school program

Cross country 
Cross country was one of the first varsity sports offered by Rhode Island School for the Deaf (RISD). According to records from Rhode Island Interscholastic League (RIIL), RISD started competing in RIIL and New England meets in 1944.

RISD is one of just three deaf schools to have had a state champion in cross country. This was in 1969. RISD offered cross country until the late 1970s when popularity in the sport started to dwindle and the school then shifted their fall sport offering to soccer for their boys' students.

Soccer 
RISD started fielding a boys' soccer team during the late 1970s and competed in RIIL-sanctioned games as well as New England Schools for the Deaf (NESD) tournaments. RISD won 12 NESD soccer tournaments from 1980 through 2002, and won two International Friendship Tournaments, held at New York State School for the Deaf in Rome, New York.

RISD also had a girls' soccer team from the late 1980s through 2003. The girls' soccer team was very strong during this time, winning seven NESD soccer titles and seven International Friendship soccer tournaments.

Now, RISD fields a coed varsity soccer team during the fall season that competes as an independent school in R.I. Interscholastic competitions and as a full member of Eastern Schools for the Deaf Athletic Association (ESDAA), competing in the annual end-of-season ESDAA Division II 8-man soccer tournaments.

Boys' basketball 
The boys' basketball team won six consecutive NESD boys' basketball championships in the 1970s, and two ESDAA championships. RISD has won 9 ESDAA Division II Boys' Basketball championships. To date, RISD has had 21 boy students who recorded over 1,000 points during their varsity basketball career, and three students who scored over 2,000 points

RISD was one of the founding member of the Coastal Prep League, a private school boys' basketball athletic conference, and won the first three conference championships from 1992 to 1994. RISD won one more CPL championship in 2009, before leaving the league starting in 2017–18.

RISD continues to field a varsity boys' basketball team that competes as an independent school in R.I. Interscholastic competitions and as a full member of ESDAA, competing in the annual end-of-season ESDAA Division II tournaments.

Girls' basketball 
RISD started to field a girls' basketball team in the mid-1970s, and success followed shortly, winning four NESD girls' basketball tournaments from 1979 to 1982. RISD's girls' basketball team has won 12 ESDAA Division II girls' basketball tournaments from 1979 through 2007. To date, RISD has had 8 girl students who recorded over 1,000 points during their varsity basketball career, and one who scored over 2,000 points.

RISD continues to field a varsity girls' basketball team that competes as an independent school in R.I. Interscholastic competitions and as a full member of ESDAA, competing in the annual end-of-season ESDAA Division II tournaments.

Track and field 
RISD has a long history in track and field. Three of its boy students earned RIIL state titles, and three hold standing ESDAA Boys' Track & Field records. The school team has twice finished second in the ESDA Track & Field Championships.

RISD girls' track & field team has had a number of excellent individual performers. Their best finish as a team in ESDAA Track & Field Championships was 3rd place, accomplished seven times. RISD has also sent a number of students to the Deaflympics, the Olympic competition for athletes who are deaf and/or hard-of-hearing, in the sport of girls basketball and track and field.

Other sports

Past
In the past RISD offered football to their boys for three seasons during the 1930s, and field hockey and softball to their girls for several seasons during the late 1970s and early 1980s.

RISD fielded cheerleading teams from 1970 through 2003. RISD's cheerleading teams won two NESD championships as well as six ESDAA cheerleading competitions.

RISD offered varsity teams in soccer, basketball and track and field, and also offered youth (elementary) soccer and basketball.

Present
Among the activities offered as part of the after-school program are:  Academic Bowl, LEGO Robotics, Battle of the Books, intramural, Girl Scouts, the Rochester Institute of Technology Middle School Math Team Competition, yearbook committee, displaying artwork at local art shows, and joining Shakespeare in the City, and JR. NAD.

References

External links
 
Guide to the Rhode Island School for the Deaf records and photographs from the Rhode Island State Archives

Schools for the deaf in the United States
Public elementary schools in Rhode Island
Public middle schools in Rhode Island
Public high schools in Rhode Island
Educational institutions established in 1876
1876 establishments in Rhode Island
Public K-12 schools in the United States
Public boarding schools in the United States
Boarding schools in Rhode Island